Bradley County Courthouse  is a courthouse in Warren, Arkansas, United States, the county seat of Bradley County, built in 1903. It was listed on the National Register of Historic Places in 1976. The courthouse was built using two colors of brick and features a 2½ story clock tower.

History
Bradley County was established in 1840 from Union County and was named for Hugh Bradley. Eventually Bradley County was fragmented into five more counties. Pennington Settlement, later renamed Warren, became the county seat around 1840. Two courthouses, a log cabin and later a brick and stucco building, were used for county business until the building of the current structure in 1903.

Architecture

The Bradley County Courthouse has a two-tone brick exterior with quoin arched windows as well as gauged voussoirs and dentils along the cornices. A tower in one corner of the structure has clocks facing all four directions, an arched cupola, and a hexagonal shaped roof. Also included on the National Register of Historic Places is a one-story brick building built in 1890. Originally the county clerk's office, the building now serves as a library.

See also

 List of county courthouses in Arkansas
National Register of Historic Places listings in Bradley County, Arkansas

References

County clerks in Arkansas
County courthouses in Arkansas
Government buildings completed in 1903
Courthouses on the National Register of Historic Places in Arkansas
National Register of Historic Places in Bradley County, Arkansas
Historic district contributing properties in Arkansas
1903 establishments in Arkansas
Hexagonal buildings
Clock towers in Arkansas
Individually listed contributing properties to historic districts on the National Register in Arkansas
Warren, Arkansas